Graham Peak is a  mountain summit located in Tooele County, Utah, United States.

Description
Graham Peak is the highest summit in the Silver Island Mountains which are a subset of the Great Basin Ranges. It is set on land controlled by the Bureau of Land Management. The community of Wendover, Utah, is 21 miles to the southwest and the Bonneville Speedway is ten miles to the south. This landform's toponym was officially adopted in 1960 by the U.S. Board on Geographic Names to honor Athol Graham (1924–1960), who was the first Utahan and second American to drive over 300 MPH on land. He was killed August 1, 1960, at the Bonneville Salt Flats while attempting to set a land speed record as the first to go over 400 MPH.

Climate
Graham Peak is set in the Great Salt Lake Desert which has hot summers and cold winters. The desert is an example of a cold desert climate as the desert's elevation makes temperatures cooler than lower elevation deserts. Due to the high elevation and aridity, temperatures drop sharply after sunset. Summer nights are comfortably cool. Winter highs are generally above freezing, and winter nights are bitterly cold, with temperatures often dropping well below freezing.

See also
 
 List of mountain peaks of Utah

References

External links
Graham Peak: weather forecast
 National Geodetic Survey Data Sheet
 Athol Graham photos

Mountains of Utah
Mountains of Tooele County, Utah
North American 2000 m summits
Great Salt Lake Desert
Mountains of the Great Basin